Scores, also known as Scores Rotisserie BBQ, is a chain of restaurants mainly in Quebec but also in Ontario. 

It was founded in Montreal in 1995. 

Their specialties are roasted chicken and ribs.

Scores is a subsidiary of Montreal-based company Imvescor Inc.

See also

 List of Canadian restaurant chains
 List of chicken restaurants

References

External links
Official website
Imvescor Inc. website

Barbecue restaurants
Restaurant chains in Canada
Restaurants in Ontario
Restaurants in Quebec
Companies based in Montreal
Restaurants in New Brunswick
Fast-food poultry restaurants